The 1991 Kebbi State gubernatorial election occurred on December 14, 1991. NRC candidate Abubakar Musa won the election, defeating SDP Abubakar Koko.

Conduct
The gubernatorial election was conducted using an open ballot system. Primaries for the two parties to select their flag bearers were conducted on October 19, 1991.

The election occurred on December 14, 1991. NRC candidate Abubakar Musa won the election, defeating SDP Abubakar Koko. Abubakar Musa polled 296,961 votes, while Abubakar Koko polled 102,543 votes.

References 

Gubernatorial election 1991
Kebbi State gubernatorial elections
Keb